Carney Ray Lansford (born February 7, 1957) is an American former professional baseball player and coach. He also played for the California Angels and the Boston Red Sox. Lansford was the 1981 American League batting champion as a member of the Red Sox and was an American League All-Star in 1988 with the Athletics.

Career
Drafted by the California Angels in the 3rd round of the 1975 Major League Baseball draft, Lansford was the Angels' most successful rookie in 1978 and finished third in the overall AL Rookie of the Year vote. He was traded along with Rick Miller and Mark Clear from the Angels to the Red Sox for Rick Burleson and Butch Hobson on December 10, 1980. In 1981, he won the American League batting title in the strike-shortened season, becoming the league's first right-handed hitter to do so in 11 years. However, the emergence of Wade Boggs resulted in the Red Sox sending Lansford to Oakland in a trade involving Tony Armas during the 1982 off-season. Lansford became the A's regular third baseman and was there for their 1988 through 1992 dynasty, typically hitting second behind Rickey Henderson. Lansford narrowly missed winning his second batting title in 1989 with a .336 average (Minnesota's Kirby Puckett finished with a .339 average). Although his power numbers dropped off during those years, and he missed almost all the 1991 season with an injury, Lansford's speed and solid hitting made him a significant contributor to the A's dynasty.

In his 15-year career, Lansford was a .290 hitter with 151 home runs, 874 RBI, and 224 stolen bases in 1862 games. In five American League Championship Series and three World Series covering 33 games, he hit .305 (39-for-128) with two home runs and 18 RBI.

Baseball writer Bill James ranked Lansford as the 39th best 3rd baseman all-time but heavily criticized his defense and wrote 'he was a good hitter but he was an awful third baseman.

Coaching career
Lansford was a hitting coach for the San Francisco Giants during the 2008 and 2009 seasons. Lansford was relieved of his duties following the 2009 season.  Lansford was hired by the Rockies for the 2011 season. In 2015, Lansford was a Batting Coach for the Lamigo Monkeys of the CPBL.

Personal life
Lansford had a cameo role as Kit "Hit or Die" Kesey, the Chicago White Sox batter that Mel Clark (played by Tony Danza) retires for the final out in the Angels' pennant-winning game in the 1994 remake of Angels in the Outfield.

He claims to be a direct descendant of Sir Francis Drake, who died with no known children.

His son, Jared, was drafted by Oakland in the second round of the 2005 amateur draft.  His other son, Josh, was a third baseman in the Chicago Cubs minor league system. His brother, Jody Lansford, spent nine seasons in the minor leagues, briefly breaking into the big leagues with the San Diego Padres, for whom he recorded 30 at bats with six hits in parts of two seasons, with one career home run. His other brother, Phil Lansford, was drafted 10th overall in the 1978 draft but never made it to the majors.

He played for the Briarwood Little League team, from Santa Clara, California, which made it to the finals of the 1969 Little League World Series. In the final game of the World Series on August 2, Carney's team was defeated 5-0 by the team from Taipei City, Taiwan. Lansford is one of fewer than a dozen men who have played in both the Little League World Series and the MLB World Series.

In 2019, Lansford created a personal web page where he announced he would be starting a web page dedicated to recapping and commenting on the Star Wars series The Mandalorian. Lansford is an avid Star Wars fan and has always stated that his favorite character was Boba Fett. However, as of 2020, the web page has been deactivated and Lansford never offered any additional public commentary on the show.

Lansford went to Wilcox High School in Santa Clara, California. The school's baseball field is named for him.

See also

 List of Major League Baseball career hits leaders
 List of Silver Slugger Award winners at third base
 List of Boston Red Sox award winners
 List of Major League Baseball career runs scored leaders
 List of Major League Baseball career stolen bases leaders
 List of Major League Baseball batting champions
 List of St. Louis Cardinals coaches

References

External links

Baseball Gauge
Carney Lansford - Baseballbiography.com
Venezuelan Professional Baseball League
1969 Little League World Series

1957 births
Living people
American League All-Stars
American League batting champions
Baseball players from San Jose, California
Boston Red Sox players
California Angels players
Colorado Rockies (baseball) coaches
El Paso Diablos players
Idaho Falls Angels players
Leones del Caracas players
American expatriate baseball players in Venezuela
Major League Baseball first basemen
Major League Baseball hitting coaches
Major League Baseball third basemen
Minor league baseball managers
Oakland Athletics coaches
Oakland Athletics players
Quad Cities Angels players
St. Louis Cardinals coaches
San Francisco Giants coaches
Tacoma Tigers players
Silver Slugger Award winners